{{Speciesbox
| image = Taxus baccata MHNT.jpg
| image_caption = Taxus baccata (European yew) shoot with mature and immature cones
| status = LC
| status_system = IUCN3.1
| status_ref = 
| genus = Taxus
| species = baccata
| authority = L.
| range_map = Taxus baccata range.svg
| range_map_caption = Natural (native + naturalised) range<ref name="Atlas">Benham, S. E., Houston Durrant, T., Caudullo, G., de Rigo, D., 2016. Taxus baccata in Europe: distribution, habitat, usage and threats. In: San-Miguel-Ayanz, J., de Rigo, D., Caudullo, G., Houston Durrant, T., Mauri, A. (Eds.), European Atlas of Forest Tree Species. Publ. Off. EU, Luxembourg, pp. e015921+</ref>
| synonyms_ref = 
| synonyms = 
}}Taxus baccata is a species of evergreen tree in the family Taxaceae, native to western, central and southern Europe (including Britain and Ireland), northwest Africa, northern Iran, and southwest Asia. It is the tree originally known as yew, though with other related trees becoming known, it may now be known as common yew, English yew, or European yew. It is primarily grown as an ornamental. Most parts of the plant are poisonous, with toxins that can be absorbed through inhalation and through the skin; consumption of even a small amount of the foliage can result in death.

Taxonomy and naming
The word yew is from Proto-Germanic *īwa-, possibly originally a loanword from Gaulish *ivos, compare Breton ivin, Irish ēo, Welsh ywen, French if (see Eihwaz for a discussion). In German it is known as Eibe. Baccata is Latin for bearing berries. The word yew as it was originally used seems to refer to the colour brown. The yew (μίλος) was known to Theophrastus, who noted its preference for mountain coolness and shade, its evergreen character and its slow growth.

Most Romance languages, with the notable exception of French (if), kept a version of the Latin word taxus (Italian tasso, Corsican tassu, Occitan teis, Catalan teix, Gasconic tech, Spanish tejo, Asturian texu, Portuguese teixo, Galician teixo and Romanian tisă) from the same root as toxic. In Slavic languages, the same root is preserved: Polish cis, Ukrainian, Slovakian and Russian tis (тис), Serbian-Croatian-Bosnian-Montenegrin tisa/тиса,  tis, Slovenian tisa. Albanian borrowed it as tis.

In Iran, the tree is known as sorkhdār (literally "the red tree").

The common yew was one of the many species first described by Linnaeus. It is one of around 30 conifer species in seven genera in the family Taxaceae, which is placed in the order Pinales.

Description 

The bark is thin, scaly brown, and comes off in small flakes aligned with the stem. The leaves are poisonous.

The arils mature 6 to 9 months after pollination, and with the seed contained, are eaten by thrushes, waxwings and other birds, which disperse the hard seeds undamaged in their droppings. Maturation of the arils is spread over 2 to 3 months, increasing the chances of successful seed dispersal. 

The seeds themselves are poisonous and bitter, but are opened and eaten by some bird species, including hawfinches, greenfinches, and great tits. The aril is not poisonous; it is gelatinous and very sweet tasting. The male cones are globose,  in diameter, and shed their pollen in early spring. Yews are mostly dioecious, but occasional individuals can be variably monoecious, or change sex with time.

Distribution and habitat 
T. baccata is native to all countries of Europe (except Iceland), the Caucasus, and beyond from Turkey eastwards to northern Iran. Its range extends south to Morocco and Algeria in North Africa. A few populations are also present in the archipelagos of the Azores and Madeira. The limit of its northern Scandinavian distribution is its sensitivity to frost, with global warming predicted to allow its spread inland. It has been introduced elsewhere, including the United States.

In England it grows best in steep slopes of the chalk downs, forming extensive stands invading the grassland outside the beech woods. In more continental climates of Europe it fares better in mixed forests, of both coniferous and mixed broadleaf-conifer composition. Under its evergreen shade, no other plants can grow.

T. baccata prefers steep rocky calcareous slopes. It rarely develops beyond saplings on acid soil when under a forest canopy, but is tolerant of soil pH when planted by humans, such as their traditional placement in churchyards and cemeteries, where some of the largest and oldest trees in northwestern Europe are found. It grows well in well-drained soils, tolerating nearly any soil type, typically humus and base-rich soils, but also on rendzina and sand soils given adequate moisture. They can survive temporary flooding and moderate droughts. Roots can penetrate extremely compressed soils, such as on rocky terrain and vertical cliff faces.

T. baccata normally appears individually or in small groups within the understory, but also forms stands throughout its range, such as in sheltered calcareous sites. T. baccata is extremely shade-tolerant, with the widest temperature range for photosynthesis among European trees, able to photosynthesize in winter after deciduous trees have shed their leaves. It can grow under partial canopies of beech and other deciduous broad-leafed trees, though it only grows into large trees without such shade.

In centuries past T. baccata was exterminated from many woodlands as a poisonous hazard to the cattle and horses that often grazed in the woods. Rabbits and deer however have a level of immunity to the poisonous alkaloids, and the seeds are dispersed by birds, with thrushes greatly enjoying the fruit. It also regenerates readily from stumps and roots, even when ancient and hollow.

Longevity
Taxus baccata can reach 400 to 600 years of age. Some specimens live longer but the age of yews is often overestimated. Ten yews in Britain are believed to predate the 10th century. The potential age of yews is impossible to determine accurately and is subject to much dispute. There is rarely any wood as old as the entire tree, while the boughs themselves often become hollow with age, making ring counts impossible. Evidence based on growth rates and archaeological work of surrounding structures suggests the oldest yews, such as the Fortingall Yew in Perthshire, Scotland, may be in the range of 2,000 years, placing them among the oldest plants in Europe. One characteristic contributing to yews' longevity is that, unlike most other trees, they are able to split under the weight of advanced growth without succumbing to disease in the fracture. Another is their ability to give rise to new epicormic and basal shoots from cut surfaces and low on their trunks, even in old age.

Significant trees

The Fortingall Yew in Perthshire, Scotland, has the largest recorded trunk girth in Britain, and experts estimate it to be 5,000 years old. The Llangernyw Yew in Clwyd, Wales, can be found at an early saint site and is about 1,500 years old. Other well known yews include the Ankerwycke Yew, the Balderschwang Yew, the Caesarsboom, the Florence Court Yew, and the Borrowdale Fraternal Four, of which poet William Wordsworth wrote. The Kingley Vale National Nature Reserve in West Sussex has one of Europe's largest yew woodlands.

The oldest specimen in Spain is located in Bermiego, Asturias. It was declared a Natural Monument on April 27, 1995, by the Asturian Government and is protected by the Plan of Natural Resources.

A unique forest formed by Taxus baccata and European box (Buxus sempervirens) lies within the city of Sochi, in the Western Caucasus.

The oldest Irish Yew (Taxus baccata 'Fastigiata'), the Florence Court Yew, still stands in the grounds of the Florence Court estate in County Fermanagh, Northern Ireland. The Irish Yew has become ubiquitous in cemeteries across the world, and it is believed that all known examples are from cuttings from this tree.

Toxicity

The entire yew bush is poisonous, with the exception of the aril (the red flesh of the berry covering the seed). Yews contain numerous toxic compounds, including "at least ten alkaloids, nitriles (cyanogenic glycoside esters), ephedrine", and their essential oil, but the most important toxins are taxine alkaloids, cardiotoxic chemical compounds which act via calcium and sodium channel antagonism. If any leaves or seeds of the plant are ingested, urgent medical attention is recommended as well as observation for at least 6 hours after the point of ingestion. The European yew is one of the most toxic species in the genus, along with the Japanese yew, T. cuspidata.

Yew poisonings are relatively common in both domestic and wild animals which consume the plant accidentally, resulting in "countless fatalities in livestock". Taxines are also absorbed efficiently via the skin. Taxus species should thus be handled with care and preferably with gloves.

"The lethal dose for an adult is reported to be 50 g of yew needles. Patients who ingest a lethal dose frequently die due to cardiogenic shock, in spite of resuscitation efforts." There are currently no known antidotes for yew poisoning, but drugs such as atropine have been used to treat the symptoms. Taxine remains in the plant all year, with maximal concentrations appearing during the winter. Dried yew plant material retains its toxicity for several months and even increases its toxicity as the water is removed. Fallen leaves should therefore also be considered toxic. Poisoning usually occurs when leaves of yew trees are eaten, but in at least one case a victim inhaled sawdust from a yew tree.

Allergenic potential
Male yews are extremely allergenic, blooming and releasing abundant amounts of pollen in the spring, with an OPALS allergy scale rating of 10 out of 10. Completely female yews have an OPALS rating of 1, the lowest possible, trapping pollen while producing none. The pollen, like most species', easily passes through window screens.

While yew pollen does not contain sufficient taxine alkaloids to cause poisoning, its allergenic potential has been implicated in adverse reactions to paclitaxel treatment.

Traditions

Historic suicides 
In the ancient Celtic world, the yew tree (*eburos) had extraordinary importance; a passage by Caesar narrates that Cativolcus, chief of the Eburones, poisoned himself with yew rather than submit to Rome (Gallic Wars 6: 31). Similarly, Florus notes that when the Cantabrians were under siege by the legate Gaius Furnius in 22 BC, most of them took their lives either by sword, fire, or a poison extracted ex arboribus taxeis, that is, from the yew tree (2: 33, 50–51). In a similar way, Orosius notes that when the Astures were besieged at Mons Medullius, they preferred to die by their own swords or by yew poison rather than surrender (6, 21, 1).

Place names 

When the Danish army conquered the city in 866, its name became .

, meanwhile, gradually reduced to York in the centuries after the Conquest, moving from the Middle English  in the 14th century through  in the 16th century to Yarke in the 17th century. The form York was first recorded in the 13th century. Many company and place names, such as the Ebor race meeting, refer to the Latinised Brittonic, Roman name.

The 12th‑century chronicler Geoffrey of Monmouth, in his fictional account of the prehistoric kings of Britain, suggests the name derives from that of a pre-Roman city founded by the legendary king Ebraucus.

The Archbishop of York uses Ebor as his surname in his signature.

The area of Ydre in the South Swedish highlands is interpreted to mean "place of yews". Two localities in particular, Idhult and Idebo, appear to be further associated with yews.

Religion

The yew is traditionally and regularly found in churchyards in England, Wales, Scotland, Ireland, and Northern France (particularly Normandy). Some examples can be found in La Haye-de-Routot or La Lande-Patry. It is said up to 40 people could stand inside one of the La-Haye-de-Routot yew trees, and the Le Ménil-Ciboult yew is probably the largest, with a girth of 13 m. Yews may grow to become exceptionally large (over 5 m diameter) and may live to be over 2,000 years old. Sometimes monks planted yews in the middle of their cloister, as at Muckross Abbey (Ireland) or abbaye de Jumièges (Normandy). Some ancient yew trees are located at St. Mary the Virgin Church, Overton-on-Dee in Wales.

In the Septuagint rendering of the Book of Nahum, 1:10, Nineveh and other deemed enemies of the biblical God are foretold to "be laid bare even to its foundation, and…devoured as a twisted yew."

In Asturian tradition and culture, the yew tree was considered to be linked with the land, people, ancestors, and ancient religion. It was tradition on All Saints' Day to bring a branch of a yew tree to the tombs of those who had died recently so they would be guided in their return to the Land of Shadows. The yew tree has been found near chapels, churches, and cemeteries since ancient times as a symbol of the transcendence of death. They are often found in the main squares of villages where people celebrated the open councils that served as a way of general assembly to rule village affairs.

It has been suggested that the sacred tree at the Temple at Uppsala was an ancient yew tree. The Christian church commonly found it expedient to take over existing pre-Christian sacred sites for churches. It has also been suggested that yews were planted at religious sites as their long life was suggestive of eternity, or because, being toxic when ingested, they were seen as trees of death. Another suggested explanation is that yews were planted to discourage farmers and drovers from letting animals wander onto the burial grounds, the poisonous foliage being the disincentive. A further possible reason is that fronds and branches of yew were often used as a substitute for palms on Palm Sunday.

King Edward I of England ordered yew trees planted in churchyards to protect the buildings. Some yews existed before their churches, as preachers held services beneath them when churches were unavailable. Due to the ability of their branches to root and sprout anew after touching the ground, yews became symbols of death, rebirth, and therefore immortality.

In interpretations of Norse cosmology, the tree Yggdrasil has traditionally been interpreted as a giant ash tree. Some scholars now believe errors were made in past interpretations of the ancient writings, and that the tree is most likely a European yew (Taxus baccata).

In the Crann Ogham—the variation on the ancient Irish Ogham alphabet which consists of a list of trees—yew is the last in the main list of 20 trees, primarily symbolizing death. There are stories of people who have committed suicide by ingesting the foliage. As the ancient Celts also believed in the transmigration of the soul, there is in some cases a secondary meaning of the eternal soul that survives death to be reborn in a new form.

Uses 

Yew wood was historically important, finding use in the Middle Ages in items such as musical instruments, furniture, and longbows. The species was felled nearly to extinction in much of Europe. In the modern day it is not considered a commercial crop due to its very slow growth, but it is valued for hedging and topiary.

Medical
Certain compounds found in the bark of yew trees were discovered in 1967 to have efficacy as anti-cancer agents. The precursors of the chemotherapy drug paclitaxel (taxol) were later shown to be synthesized easily from extracts of the leaves of European yew, which is a much more renewable source than the bark of the Pacific yew (Taxus brevifolia) from which they were initially isolated. This ended a point of conflict in the early 1990s; many environmentalists, including Al Gore, had opposed the destructive harvesting of Pacific yew for paclitaxel cancer treatments. Docetaxel can then be obtained by semi-synthetic conversion from the precursors.

Woodworking

Wood from the yew is classified as a closed-pore softwood, similar to cedar and pine. Easy to work, yew is among the hardest of the softwoods, yet it possesses a remarkable elasticity, making it ideal for products that require springiness, such as bows. The wood is esteemed for cabinetry and tool handles. The hard, slow-growing wood also finds use in gates, furniture, parquet floors, and paneling. Its typical burls and contorted growth, with intricate multicolored patterns, make it attractive for carving and woodturning, but also make the wood unsuited for construction. It is good firewood and is sometimes burnt as incense. Due to all parts of the yew and its volatile oils being poisonous and cardiotoxic, a mask should be worn if one comes in contact with sawdust from the wood.

One of the world's oldest surviving wooden artifacts is a Clactonian yew spear head, found in 1911 at Clacton-on-Sea, in Essex, UK. Known as the Clacton Spear, it is estimated to be over 400,000 years old.

Longbows 
Yew is also associated with Wales and England because of the longbow, an early weapon of war developed in northern Europe, and as the English longbow the basis for a medieval tactical system. The oldest surviving yew longbow was found at Rotten Bottom in Dumfries and Galloway, Scotland. It has been given a calibrated radiocarbon date of 4040 BC to 3640 BC and is on display in the National Museum of Scotland. Yew is the wood of choice for longbow making; the heartwood is always on the inside of the bow with the sapwood on the outside. This makes most efficient use of their properties as heartwood is best in compression whilst sapwood is superior in tension. However, much yew is knotty and twisted, and therefore unsuitable for bowmaking; most trunks do not give good staves and even in a good trunk much wood has to be discarded.

There was a tradition of planting yew trees in churchyards throughout Britain and Ireland, among other reasons, as a resource for bows, such as at "Ardchattan Priory whose yew trees, according to other accounts, were inspected by Robert the Bruce and cut to make at least some of the longbows used at the Battle of Bannockburn."

The trade of yew wood to England for longbows was so robust that it depleted the stocks of good-quality, mature yew over a vast area. The first documented import of yew bowstaves to England was in 1294. In 1423 the Polish king commanded protection of yews in order to cut exports, facing nearly complete destruction of local yew stock. In 1470 compulsory archery practice was renewed, and hazel, ash, and laburnum were specifically allowed for practice bows. Supplies still proved insufficient, until by the Statute of Westminster in 1472, every ship coming to an English port had to bring four bowstaves for every tun. Richard III of England increased this to ten for every tun. This stimulated a vast network of extraction and supply, which formed part of royal monopolies in southern Germany and Austria. In 1483, the price of bowstaves rose from two to eight pounds per hundred, and in 1510 the Venetians would only sell a hundred for sixteen pounds. 

In 1507 the Holy Roman Emperor asked the Duke of Bavaria to stop cutting yew, but the trade was profitable, and in 1532 the royal monopoly was granted for the usual quantity "if there are that many." In 1562, the Bavarian government sent a long plea to the Holy Roman Emperor asking him to stop the cutting of yew, and outlining the damage done to the forests by its selective extraction, which broke the canopy and allowed wind to destroy neighbouring trees. In 1568, despite a request from Saxony, no royal monopoly was granted because there was no yew to cut, and the next year Bavaria and Austria similarly failed to produce enough yew to justify a royal monopoly. Forestry records in this area in the 17th century do not mention yew, and it seems that no mature trees were to be had. The English tried to obtain supplies from the Baltic, but at this period bows were being replaced by guns in any case.

Musical instruments
The late Robert Lundberg, a noted luthier who performed extensive research on historical lute-making methodology, states in his 2002 book Historical Lute Construction that yew was historically a prized wood for lute construction. European legislation establishing use limits and requirements for yew limited supplies available to luthiers, but it was apparently as prized among medieval, renaissance, and baroque lute builders as Brazilian rosewood is among contemporary guitar-makers for its quality of sound and beauty.

Horticulture

Today European yew is widely used in landscaping and ornamental horticulture. Due to its dense, dark green, mature foliage, and its tolerance of even very severe pruning, it is used especially for formal hedges and topiary. Its relatively slow growth rate means that in such situations it needs to be clipped only once per year (in late summer).

European yew will tolerate a wide range of soils and situations, including shallow chalk soils and shade, although in deep shade its foliage may be less dense. However it cannot tolerate waterlogging, and in poorly-draining situations is liable to succumb to the root-rotting pathogen Phytophthora cinnamomi.

T. baccata is tolerant of urban pollution, cold, and heat, though soil compaction e.g. by roads can harm it. With its soft bark, the tree can be killed over time by rubbing such as by climbing children.

In Europe, Taxus baccata grows naturally north to Molde in southern Norway, but it is used in gardens further north. It is also popular as a bonsai in many parts of Europe and makes a handsome small- to large-sized bonsai.

Well over 200 cultivars of T. baccata have been named. The most popular of these are the Irish yew (T. baccata 'Fastigiata'), a fastigiate cultivar of the European yew selected from two trees found growing in Ireland, and the several cultivars with yellow leaves, collectively known as "golden yew". In some locations, e.g. when hemmed in by buildings or other trees, an Irish yew can reach 20 feet in height without exceeding 2 feet in diameter at its thickest point, although with age many Irish yews assume a fat cigar shape rather than being truly columnar.

AGM cultivars
The following cultivars have gained the Royal Horticultural Society's Award of Garden Merit:- 

T. baccata
T. baccata 'Fastigiata' (Irish yew)
T. baccata 'Fastigiata Aureomarginata' (golden Irish yew)
T. baccata 'Icicle' 
T. baccata 'Repandens'
T. baccata 'Repens Aurea'
T. baccata 'Semperaurea'
T. baccata 'Standishii'

Privies 
In England, yew has historically been sometimes associated with privies (outside toilets), possibly because the smell of the plant keeps insects away.

Conservation
Historically, T. baccata populations were gravely threatened by felling for longbows and destruction to protect livestock from poisoning. It is now endangered in parts of its range due to intensive land use. The species is also harvested to meet pharmaceutical demand for taxanes. Trees are often damaged by browsing and bark stripping. Yew's thin bark makes it vulnerable to fire. Its toxicity protects against many insects, but the yew mite causes significant bud mortality, and seedlings can be killed by fungi.

Clippings from ancient specimens in the UK, including the Fortingall Yew, were taken to the Royal Botanic Gardens in Edinburgh to form a mile-long hedge. The purpose of this "Yew Conservation Hedge Project" is to maintain the DNA of Taxus baccata.

Another conservation programme was run in Catalonia in the early 2010s by the Forest Sciences Centre of Catalonia (CTFC) in order to protect genetically endemic yew populations and preserve them from overgrazing and forest fires. In the framework of this programme, the 4th International Yew Conference was organised in the Poblet Monastery in 2014.

There has also been a conservation programme in northern Portugal and Northern Spain (Cantabrian Range).

See also
 List of poisonous plants
 List of plants poisonous to equines

References

Further reading
 Chetan, A. and Brueton, D. (1994) The Sacred Yew, London: Arkana, 
 Hartzell, H. (1991) The yew tree: a thousand whispers: biography of a species, Eugene: Hulogosi, 
 Simón, F. M. (2005) Religion and Religious Practices of the Ancient Celts of the Iberian Peninsula, e-Keltoi, v. 6, p. 287-345,  online

External links

 Monumentaltrees.com: Images and location details of ancient yews
 Life+ TAXUS.cat: Taxus conservation programme in Catalonia 
 Forest Sciences Centre of Catalonia (CTFC)—Biology Conservation Department 
 Taxus baccata—distribution map, genetic conservation units, and related resources from the European Forest Genetic Resources Programme (EUFORGEN)

baccata
Flora of Europe
Flora of Iran
Flora of North Africa
Flora of the Azores
Flora of the Caucasus
Flora of Turkey
Garden plants of Asia
Garden plants of Europe
Medicinal plants of Asia
Medicinal plants of Europe
Ornamental trees
Poisonous plants
Plants described in 1753
Plants used in bonsai
Taxa named by Carl Linnaeus
Trees of humid continental climate
Trees of mild maritime climate